Stéphane is a male French given name an equivalent of Stephen/Steven. Notable people with this given name include:

Stéphane Adam (born 1969), French footballer
Stéphane Agbre Dasse (born 1989), Burkinabé football player
Stéphane Allagnon, French film director and screenwriter
Stéphane Antiga (born 1976), French volleyball player
Stéphane Artano
Stéphane Audran 
Stéphane Augé (born 1974), French road racing cyclist
Stéphane Auger (born 1970), Canadian hockey referee
Stéphane Auvray 
Stéphane Azambre 
Stéphane Bancel (born 1972/1973), French billionaire businessman
Stéphane Beauregard (born 1968), Canadian ice hockey player
Stéphane Belmondo 
Stéphane Bergeron 
Stéphane Bernadis 
Stéphane Besle 
Stéphane Biakolo 
Stéphane Billette 
Stéphane Maurice Bongho-Nouarra (1937–2007), Congolese politician
Stéphane Bonneau
Stéphane Bonnes 
Stéphane Bonsergent 
Stéphane Borbiconi 
Stéphane Boudin 
Stéphane Breitwieser 
Stéphane Bruey 
Stéphane Bré 
Stéphane Buckland 
Stéphane Bureau 
Stéphane Bédard 
Stéphane Caristan 
Stéphane Carnot 
Stéphane Caron 
Stéphane Cassard 
Stéphane Chapuisat 
Stéphane Clamens 
Stéphane Collet 
Stéphane Courtois
Stéphane Crête 
Stéphane Dalmat 
Stéphane Darbion 
Stéphane Demers 
Stéphane Demets 
Stéphane Demilly
Stéphane Demol 
Stéphane Denève 
Stéphane Derenoncourt 
Stéphane Diagana
Stéphane Dimy 
Stéphane Dion 
Stéphane Ducret 
Stéphane Dujarric (born 1966), spokesperson under UN Secretary-General Kofi Annan 
Stéphane Dumont 
Stéphane Fiset  
Stéphane Émard-Chabot 
Stéphane Fortin (born 1974), Canadian football player
Stéphane Franke
Stéphane Freiss
Stéphane Galland 
Stéphane Garcia 
Stéphane Gendron 
Stéphane Gillet 
Stéphane de Gérando 
Stéphane Glas
Stéphane Goubert
Stéphane Grappelli 
Stéphane Grichting (born 1979), Swiss football player
Stéphane Grégoire 
Stéphane Guillaume 
Stéphane Guivarc'h (born 1970), French football player
Stéphane Guérin-Tillié 
Stéphane Haccoun, French boxer
Stéphane Henchoz
Stéphane Heulot
Stéphane Kingue Mpondo 
Stéphane Lambiel (born 1985), Swiss figure skater 
Stéphane Laporte
Stéphane Le Foll 
Stéphane Lecat 
Stéphane Leduc
Stéphane Lhomme
Stéphane Lupasco
Stéphane Léoni 
Stéphane M'Bia 
Stéphane Mahé 
Stéphane Mallarmé 
Stéphane Mallat 
Stéphane Mangione 
Stéphane Martine 
Stéphane Masala (born 1976), French footballer and manager
Stéphane Matteau  
Stéphane Mbia  
Stéphane Mertens 
Stéphane Michon 
Stéphane Morin 
Stéphane Morisot 
Stéphane N'Guéma  
Stéphane Nomis 
Stéphane Noro 
Stéphane Ortelli  
Stéphane Paille 
Stéphane Paquette 
Stéphane Pasquier 
Stéphane Pedrazzi 
Stéphane Pedron 
Stéphane Pelle
Stéphane Persol (born 1968), French former football player
Stéphane Peterhansel 
Stéphane Pichot 
Stéphane Picq 
Stéphane Pignol 
Stéphane Pocrain 
Stéphane Pompougnac 
Stéphane Porato 
Stéphane Poulat 
Stéphane Poulhies 
Stéphane Pounewatchy
Stéphane Pourcain 
Stéphane Praxis Rabemananjara
Stéphane Provost
Stéphane Pédron 
Stéphane Quintal 
Stéphane Richer (ice hockey defenceman) (born 1966), Canadian ice hockey player
Stéphane Richer (ice hockey forward) (born 1966), Canadian ice hockey player
Stéphane Rideau 
Stéphane Robidas 
Stéphane Rousseau
Stéphane Roy (ice hockey, born 1967) (born 1967), ice hockey player
Stéphane Roy (ice hockey, born 1976) (born 1976), ice hockey player
Stéphane Ruffier
Stéphane Samson
Stéphane Sanseverino 
Stéphane Sarni 
Stéphane Sarrazin 
Stéphane Sednaoui 
Stéphane Sessegnon 
Stéphane Stoecklin 
Stéphane Traineau 
Stéphane Tremblay 
Stéphane Udry 
Stéphane Van Der Heyden 
Stéphane Venne
Stéphane Viry
Stéphane Vossart
Stéphane Yelle 
Stéphane Ziani 
Stéphane Zubar (born 1986), French football player

See also
Stéphane Ratel Organisation, motorsports organization
Étienne
Stéphanie
Stephen

Given names
Masculine given names
French masculine given names